Niall Harrison is a British medical writer and science fiction editor and critic. He was a judge of the Arthur C. Clarke Award in 2006 and 2007 and Guest of Honour at Eastercon 2023.

Biography
Harrison attended Reading Blue Coat School and read biochemistry at Magdalen College, Oxford, from 1998 to 2002. He currently lives in Newcastle and works as a medical writer. He is co-chair of the ACCORD Steering Committee, which is developing a guideline to improve the reporting of biomedical studies that use consensus methodologies.

Science Fiction
Between 2006 and 2010, Harrison was editor of Vector – the magazine of the British Science Fiction Association – as well as writing Torque Control, Vector's editorial blog. Between 2007 and 2010, he was senior reviews editor for Strange Horizons; in 2010 he became editor-in-chief, a position he served in until stepping down in 2017. As a critic, his work has appeared in Interzone, Foundation and The New York Review of Science Fiction as well as Vector and Strange Horizons.

References

External links

British speculative fiction critics
British speculative fiction editors
Science fiction editors
Science fiction critics
Living people
1980 births